Marini (last name) is a surname of Roman/Italian Catholic origin; closely associated with the last names: Marino and Mariani with the three patronymic forms emerging from the same region at approximately the same time. Migrations branching from Italy ca.1600 gave rise to their modern forms as surnames. The Marinid dynasty was a Sunni Muslim dynasty of Zenata Berber descent that ruled Morocco from the 13th to the 15th century.

Notable people with the Marini surname include:

 15-18th century
Andrea Pasqualino Marini (1660–1712), Italian painter active in the Marche region, Italy
Antoine Marini (15th-century) French theologian and political thinker, who contemplated the establishing of a European Court of Justice and a pan-European parliament 
Antonio Marini (1788–1861), Italian painter, mainly of sacred subjects for churches in Tuscany
Biagio Marini (1594–1663), Italian virtuoso violinist and composer 
Domenico de' Marini (died 1635), Roman Catholic Titular Patriarch of Jerusalem (1627–1635), and Archbishop of Genoa (1616–1635)
Domenico de' Marini (1599-1669), Roman Catholic bishop
Domenico de' Marini (died 1676), Roman Catholic Titular Archbishop of Teodosia 
:de:Girolamo Marini (Architekt) or Hieronimo Marini (died 1553) Baroque master stonemason and Italian renaissance architect; royal architect of Francis I (c.1535); notable contributions as an early pioneer of German (c.1545) defensive architecture/military engineering; brother of Camillo Mariani, early pioneer of modern French defensive architecture/military engineering (notably Verdun); and notable for his surviving sculpting works: sculptures by Mariani 
Giambattista Marini or Giovanni Battista Marino (1569–1625), Italian poet; early pioneer of Marinism
:it:Giovanni Agostino De Marini (1572–1642) King of Corsica(city state) and 105th Doge of Genoa
Biagio Marini (ca. 1587–1663), Italian composer; founder of the Tremolo (Italian: Bisbigliando) for string orchestra (Biago's violin sonatas contain the first ever tremolo notation found for instruments) 
Elias Marini, O.F.M. or Elias Marinich (died 1641), Roman Catholic Bishop of Sardica 
Giovanni Battista de Marinis (died 169), Master of the Order of Preachers from 1650 until his death
:it:Francesco Maria Marini or Mariani  (1630–1686) highly influential playwright and Catholic archbishop, son of Giovanni Agostino De Marini
John Marini, American political scientist
Leonardo Marini (1509–1573),  theologian and Italian archbishop of the Dominican Order of Catholic Church
Luigi Gaetano Marini (archaeologist) (1742–1815) "The Restorer"; made cameriere d'onore of the pope and primus custos of the Vatican Library. Luigi's exact religious affiliation with the Catholic Church is uncertain. His notable scholarship include the classification of five thousand inscriptions and Latin epigraphics
Marco Marini (1542–1594), Italian orientalist, and censor of Hebrew language publications for the Vatican.
Paolo Marini (18th century), Italian painter
Pietro Marini (1794–1863) Italian cardinal; notable for his coat of arms' conservative motto: Ne quid nimis. Pietro was entrusted numerous prefectures and protectorships within Italy; appointed Governor of Rome, vice-Camerlengo of the Holy Roman Church and Director-General of the Police in his lifetime
Niccolò Marini (1843–1923) Italian cardinal; recorded descendant of Pietro Marini. Notable for his liberal agenda and his work with Catholic Action in creating the Gaetana Agnesi women's club; Niccolo was exceptionally decorated with international honours and recognitions of merit in European knightly orders. His life's pursuit was to seek reconciliation of Eastern and Western Christianity, undertaking great labours and missions as secretary of the Congregation for the Oriental Churches

 19-20th century
Adrián Marini (born 1972), Argentine football manager and former player
Alberto Marini (born 1972), Italian screenwriter and producer based in Spain
Alfredo Marini (born 1915), Italian professional football player
Antonietta Marini-Rainieri, Italian operatic soprano
Carlo Marini, Canadian former international soccer player
Catiuscia Marini (born 1967), Italian politician and manager, President of the Umbria region from 2010 to 2019
Dante Marini (born 1992), American soccer player
Enrico Marini (born 1969), Swiss/Italian comic artist
Fiorenzo Marini (1914-1991), Italian fencer
Francis L. Marini, Massachusetts politician and jurist
Franco Marini (born 1933) Italian senator, President of the Italian Senate (2006–2008)
Giacomo Marini (born 1951), founder of Noventi, co-founder of Logitech, Chairman and CEO of Neato Robotics 
Gianpiero Marini (born 1951), Italian footballer
Gilles Marini (born 1976), French/American actor and professional dancer
Giovanna Marini (maiden name: Salviucci) (born 1937), Italian singer-songwriter
Guido Marini (born 1965), Italian priest; Master of Pontifical Liturgical Celebrations
Ignazio Marini (1811-1873), Italian operatic bass
Jan Marini Alano (born 1978), actress from the Philippines
John Marini, American political scientist
Joseph Hector Marini (born 1957), Canadian retired ice hockey forward
Louis "Lou" Marini, Jr. (born 1945), American blues/jazz composer and saxophonist of the original Saturday Night Live 
Luca Marini (born 1997), Italian motorcycle racer
Luigi Gaetano Marini (1742–1815), Italian natural philosopher, jurist, historian, archaeologist and epigraphist
Luigi Marini (singer)  (1885–1942), Italian lyric tenor (opera) 
Mara Marini, Canadian actress
Marilú Marini (born 1945), Argentine actress 
Marino Marini (bishop) (1804–1885), Roman Catholic titular bishop of Orvieto from 1865 to 1871, diplomatic of the Holy See
Marino Marini (musician) (1924–1997), Italian musician 
Marino Marini (sculptor) (1901–1980), Italian sculptor (see the Marino Marini Museum)
Marino Marini (musician) (1924–1997), Italian contemporary musician
Miguel Marini (born 1927),  de facto Governor of Córdoba, Argentina 
Modesto Marini, Italian chef, restaurateur and founder of The Marini's Group
Nicolas Marini (born 1993), Italian professional racing cyclist
Niccolò Marini (1843–1923),  Italian Cardinal of the Catholic Church; secretary of the Congregation for the Oriental Churches from 1917 to 1922
Philippe Marini (born 1950), French politician, former member of the Senate of France
Pablo Marini (born 1967), Argentine former football player and manager
Piero Marini (born 1942), Italian archbishop; President of the Congregation for the Oriental Churches
Pierre Marini Bodho (born 1938), Presiding Bishop of the Church of Christ in Congo
Ruy Mauro Marini (1932–1997), Brazilian economist and sociologist
Samuel Castelan Marini (born 1985),  Mexican singer 
Tomás Leandro Marini (1902-1984), Argentine ichthyologist
Valeria Marini (born 1967), Italian model, actress, showgirl and fashion designer

 21st century
Tommaso Marini (born 2000), Italian right-handed foil fencer

 Fictional characters
 Enrico Marini, a member of the S.T.A.R.S. (Special Tactics And Rescue Service) in the survival horror video games series Resident Evil

See also
Marinism (a poet society of Marinists following Marinisimo) 
Marianismo (a Catholic society of Marianists following Marianism) 
Saint Marinus (Legendary founder of the society that became the independent Republic of San Marino) 
The History of San Marino and the Leges Statutae Republicae Sancti Marini (referring to the Constitution of San Marino created October 8, 1600).
The Marinid or Mariní people (describing both ethnicity and the Marinid dynasty)
Mariani (surname)

References

Italian-language surnames